Edward F. Kook (1903–1990) was an American stage lighting engineer who helped to develop the art form, receiving a Special Tony Award for his contributions in 1952. He was a lecturer in it at two Ivy League universities, Columbia University and Yale School of Drama, and was president of the United States Institute for Theatre Technology from 1975 to 1977.

References

External links

1903 births
1990 deaths
American lighting designers
Columbia University staff
Yale University staff